Lyells may refer to:

Lyells, Virginia, unincorporated community
Ruby Stutts Lyells (1908–1994), American librarian and feminist

See also
Lyell (disambiguation)